Brian Peter John Molloy  (12 August 1930 – 31 July 2022) was a New Zealand plant ecologist, conservationist, and rugby union player.

Early life, education and family
Born in Wellington on 12 August 1930, and orphaned at a young age, Molloy grew up in Waikanae and Palmerston North. He was educated at Marist Brothers' High School in Palmerston North, and then completed a Diploma in Agriculture at Massey Agricultural College in 1950. He went on to gain a Diploma in Teaching from Christchurch Teachers' College, and studied botany at Canterbury University College, where he graduated BSc in 1957, and MSc with first-class honours in 1960. The title of his master's thesis was A study in subalpine plant ecology on Fog Peak Ridge, Porters Pass, Canterbury. In 1966, Molloy completed a PhD on the autecology of sweet brier, Rosa rubiginosa, under the supervision of Reinhart Langer at Lincoln College, at that time a constituent college of the University of Canterbury.

In 1957, Molloy married Barbara Anita O'Neill, and the couple went on to have four children.

Rugby union career
A halfback, Molloy made his debut for Manawatu at a provincial level while still a teenager, and later represented Canterbury when he was a university student in Christchurch. He was a member of the New Zealand national side, the All Blacks, on their 1957 tour of Australia, playing in five games and scoring one try. However, he did not appear in any of the test matches. From 1975 to 1978, Molloy served as a New Zealand Universities selector.

Scientific career
After his master's studies, Molloy worked for the Department of Agriculture as a research officer, investigating tussock grasslands, pasture ecology and weeds. In 1969, he moved to the botany division of the Department of Scientific and Industrial Research (DSIR)—later known as Landcare Research—where he remained until his retirement in 1995. At DSIR / Landcare Research, he specialised in plant taxonomy, nature conservation, and the history of soil and vegetation. Subsequently, Molloy worked as a botanical and conservation consultant, and maintained his relationship with Landcare Research as a research associate.

Regarded as the leading authority on New Zealand orchids, Molloy authored or co-authored over 100 scientific papers, and several books. His canonical text, Native Orchids of New Zealand, written with J.H. Johns, was published in 1983.

Taxonomist

Conservation activities
Between 1989 and 1998, Molloy was a director of the Queen Elizabeth II National Trust. He then served as the trust's high-country representative until 2012. He was also been active in many other conservation groups, leading to the establishment of new, and extension of existing, protected areas and reserves. In particular, he is acknowledged as transforming Riccarton Bush after years of mismanagement.

Later life and death
Molloy was widowed by the death of his wife, Barbara Molloy, in 2017. He died in Christchurch on 31 July 2022.

Honours and awards
Molloy was awarded the Loder Cup in 1990, in recognition of his contributions to conservation and the study of New Zealand native plants. He received a community service award in 1992 and a civic award in 1995, both from the Christchurch City Council. Also in 1995, Molloy received the Charles Fleming Award for Environmental Achievement from the Royal Society of New Zealand.

In the 1997 Queen's Birthday Honours, Molloy was appointed an Officer of the New Zealand Order of Merit, for services to conservation.

For his contributions to the science, land and people of the high country, Molloy received the high country committee of Federated Farmers award in 2000; and in 2006 he was accorded a lifetime conservation achievement award by the New Zealand Plant Conservation Network. The following year, he was named as an associate of honour by the Royal New Zealand Institute of Horticulture, in recognition of his distinguished service to horticulture in New Zealand. In 2010, Molloy was awarded the Bledisloe Trophy by the Canterbury Botanical Society, for his contribution to New Zealand botany.

Molloy was elected as a Companion of the Royal Society of New Zealand in 2011, for the promotion and advancement of science and technology in New Zealand.  Also in 2011, he received the Hatch Medal of the New Zealand Native Orchid Group, for his outstanding contribution to orchidology in New Zealand.

Honorific eponyms
Two endemic plants have been named in Molloy's honour: the Cook Strait kōwhai, Sophora molloyi, in 2001; and the hidden spider orchid, Molloybas cryptanthus, in 2002.

In 2012, the Brian Molloy QEII National Trust Scholarship for doctoral research in New Zealand ecology was established.

Selected publications 

 Ferns in Peel Forest: a Field Guide, 1983, Christchurch, N.Z., Department of Lands and Survey
 Riccarton Bush, Putaringamotu : natural history and management, 1995, Christchurch, N.Z., Riccarton Bush Trust

References

1930 births
2022 deaths
Scientists from Wellington City
New Zealand rugby union players
New Zealand international rugby union players
Manawatu rugby union players
Canterbury rugby union players
Rugby union scrum-halves
Massey University alumni
University of Canterbury alumni
Lincoln University (New Zealand) alumni
New Zealand public servants
People associated with Department of Scientific and Industrial Research (New Zealand)
20th-century New Zealand botanists
New Zealand ecologists
New Zealand conservationists
Officers of the New Zealand Order of Merit
Companions of the Royal Society of New Zealand
Orchidologists
Rugby union players from Wellington City
People educated at St Peter's College, Palmerston North